Emine Ecem Esen (born May 3, 1994) is a Turkish women's football midfielder currently playing in the First League for Galatasaray with jersey number 8. She is a member of the Turkish national team since 2011.

Early life 
Emine Ecem Esen was born on May 3, 1994, in Güngören district of Istanbul. She followed the footsteps of her maternal cousin, who is a footballer. She remembers that the main theme in her home was about football. With the encouragement of her aunt, she began playing football and got registered in the nearby club Hasköy, which had recently established a women's football team.

Club career 

She received her license on June 17, 2009, for the Women's Regional League team Hasköy, where she played one season. In the 2010–11 season, she moved to Çamlıcaspor playing in the Women's First League. After three seasons, Esen signed for Marmara Üniversitesi Spor starting in the 2013–14 season.

On January 10, 2014, Esen was transferred by the Istanbul-based club Ataşehir Belediyespor. After one season, she left Ataşehir Belediyespor to play for Beşiktaş J.K.  in the Women's Second League. She enjoyed the champion title of her team in the 2018–19 season. She took part at the 2019–20 UEFA Women's Champions League - Group 9 matches.

ALG Spor 
In the 2019-20 Women's First League season, she transferred to the Gaziantep-based club ALG Spor. She enjoyed the 2021-22 Women's Super League champion title of her team.

Galatasaray 
On 9 August 2022, she transferred to the Women's Super League club  Galatasaray.

International career 
Esen debuted in the Turkey women's national team in the Kuban Spring Tournament qualification match against Belarus on March 8, 2011.

She was member of the women's U-19 national team and capped 20 times in total playing against Iceland and Germany at the 2011 UEFA Women's U-19 Championship Second qualifying round Group 3, against Portugal, at the 2012 UEFA Women's U-19 Championship – Final tournament Group A and finally against Scotland and Belarus at the 2013 UEFA Women's U-19 Championship First qualifying round Group 5 matches.

Esen played at the 2015 FIFA Women's World Cup qualification – UEFA Group 6 matches against England, Ukraine and Belarus.

Career statistics 
.

Honours 
 Turkish Women's First League
 Ataşehir Belediyespor
 Runners-up (2): 2013–14, 2014–15

 Beşiktaş J.K.
 Winners (1): 2018–19
 Runners-up (2): 2016–17, 2017–18

 ALG Spor
 Winners (2): 2019-20, 2021-22
 Third places (1): 2020–21

 Turkish Women's Second League
 Beşiktaş J.K.
 Winners (1): 2015–16

References

External links

Living people
1994 births
People from Güngören
Footballers from Istanbul
Turkish women's footballers
Women's association football midfielders
Marmara Üniversitesi Spor players
Ataşehir Belediyespor players
Turkey women's international footballers
Beşiktaş J.K. women's football players
ALG Spor players
Turkish Women's Football Super League players
Galatasaray S.K. women's football players
20th-century Turkish sportswomen
21st-century Turkish sportswomen